Wuxi North railway station is a freight-handling railway station in Huishan District, Wuxi, Jiangsu, China. It is an intermediate stop on the Beijing–Shanghai railway and is also connected by a short stretch of track to the Xinyi–Changxing railway.

History
The station opened in 1908. In 2003, the name of the station was changed from Shitangwan to Wuxi North.

References 

Railway stations in Jiangsu
Railway stations in China opened in 1908
Buildings and structures in Wuxi
Transport in Wuxi